is a Japanese original short anime television series produced by Liden Films.  It aired from October to December 2021 on the Super Animeism programming block.

Characters

Media

Manga 

A manga adaptation, also written and illustrated by Akane Malbeni, was serialized in Flex Comix's Comic Polaris website from September 30, 2021 to 2022. The series was collected into a single tankōbon volume, published by Flex Comix on May 13, 2022.

Volume list

Anime 

The original story is credited to Naminoue Seinendan and produced by Japanese studio Liden Films, with direction and character design by Ushio Tazawa and series composition and original character design by Akane Malbeni; Kaori Akatsu and Norifumi Okuno designed the props, with music by Hiroshi Nakamura, sound direction by Ryousuke Naya, sound work credited to Studio Mouse, editing by Satomi Yamada, backgrounds supervised by Miu Miyamoto, colour design by Kunio Tsujita, compositing supervised by Mitsuyoshi Yamamoto and CG directed by Yoshimasa Yamazaki.  The series aired from October 2 to December 18, 2021, on the Super Animeism block on MBS, TBS and other channels. Aoi Kubo performed the series's theme song "Otogibanashi no Yо̄ na Kiseki".

The series had its international premiere on August 25, 2021, at the 25th Fantasia International Film Festival in Montreal as a closing-day screening.

In North America, GKIDS will screen the series in theaters in 2022.

Episode list

Release 

The animated series has been licensed for North America by GKIDS and for the United Kingdom and the Republic of Ireland by Anime Limited. It was released in cinemas in North America as part of event screenings of the unrelated feature film Fortune Favours Lady Nikuko and in the United Kingdom and the Republic of Ireland the same way on August 10, 2022.

Notes

References

External links 

 Official website 
 Official Twitter 
 

2021 anime television series debuts
Anime with original screenplays
Animeism
Fantasy anime and manga
Flex Comix manga
Japanese webcomics
Liden Films
Shōjo manga